Qingshui District, also spelled as Chingshui District, is a coastal suburban district in western Taichung City, Taiwan.

Geography 
Qingshui is located on the Qingshui Plain of Taiwan. It borders the Taiwan Strait to the west, the Dajia River to the north, and the Dadu Plateau to the east. Qingshui shares borders with Da'an, Dajia, and Waipu to the north, Shengang to the east, and Wuqi and Shalu to the south.

History 
The earliest evidence of humans living in this area is from 4000 years ago in the Neolithic Age. The archaeological site is preserved in the Niumatou Site. Before the influx of the Han Chinese, this area was known as Gomach (牛罵頭) by the Papora people.

In the Qing Dynasty, the Kangxi Emperor opened up the area for Chinese settlement. During this time, the area was known as Niumatou, which is an alternative pronunciation of Gomach. The two largest families that moved into this area were the Yang and the Tsai. Today, these two surnames remain as the most prominent surnames in Qingshui.

During Japanese Rule, the name was changed to Kiyomizu Town (清水街), which was administered under Taikō District, Taichu Prefecture.

After the Nationalists took over, the Japanese name was preserved but with the Chinese pronunciation Qingshui Township. It was located within Taichung County. In 2010, Taichung County was promoted into a special municipality, and Qingshui was promoted from a "township" to a "district".

Tourist attractions 
 Gaomei Wetlands: a 701-acre wetland formed when an embankment was constructed for the Port of Taichung, causing the Dajia River's sediment to settle in this area.
 Gaomei Lighthouse
 Niumatou Site: a Neolithic archaeological site dating from 4000 years ago.
 Taichung City Seaport Art Center
 Wuqi Fishing Port
 Ziyun Temple: a Buddhist temple dedicated to Guanyin, dating back to 1750 AD.

Transportation 
Qingshui is served by the TRA Qingshui and Taichung Port stations.

Qingshui is served by the following national roads:
  National Freeway 3: The Zhongang System Interchange, which connects to Freeway 4 and the Qingshui Rest Stop are located in the district.
  National Freeway 3: The Zhongang System Interchange, which connects to Freeway 3 and the Qingshui Interchange are located in the district.
  Provincial Highway 1
  Provincial Highway 10
  Provincial Highway 10B, a branch of Provincial Highway 10
  Provincial Highway 17
  Provincial Highway 61

There is also a railway line.

Notable people 
 Liao Tian-ding, a Robin Hood figure during the Japanese rule.
 Cheng Yen, Buddhist bhikkhu and philosopher
 Paul Chu, physicist
 Tsai Chi-chang, vice president of Legislative Yuan
 Li Jing, TV hostess and model
 Tsai Dui, Minister of Transportation and Communication

See also 
 Taichung

References 

Districts of Taichung